Turner's Peninsula is a 110 km-long peninsula in southern Sierra Leone, running westwards, parallel to the coast, bounded by the Atlantic Ocean.  The peninsula was occupied by the British from 1825 and is inhabited along all of its length.

References
Peter Tucker The Mission Boy from Shebar AuthorHouse, Jul 29, 2011 pg. 1

Peninsulas of Sierra Leone